Wolfgang Herrmann Elsner (11 September 1906 – 1 January 1981) was a German sailor who competed in the 1952 Summer Olympics.

References

External links
 
 
 

1906 births
1981 deaths
German male sailors (sport)
Olympic sailors of Germany
Sailors at the 1952 Summer Olympics – 6 Metre